Fernando Meligeni was the defending champion, but lost in the quarterfinals to Grant Stafford.

Michael Chang won the title, defeating Grant Stafford 4–6, 6–2, 6–1 in the final.

Seeds
A champion seed is indicated in bold text while text in italics indicates the round in which that seed was eliminated.

  Michael Chang (champion)
  MaliVai Washington (first round)
  Petr Korda (second round)
  Alex O'Brien (quarterfinals)
  Jason Stoltenberg (semifinals)
  Chris Woodruff (semifinals)
  Byron Black (quarterfinals)
  Sandon Stolle (second round)

Draw

External links
 Singles draw

Singles